Magilligan is a peninsula that lies in the northwest of County Londonderry, Northern Ireland, at the entrance to Lough Foyle, within Causeway Coast and Glens district. It is an extensive  coastal site, part British army firing range, part nature reserve and is home to the HM Prison Magilligan. The settlement of Magilligan Point on the lough is noted for its ferry crossing to Greencastle, County Donegal.

History
Magilligan gets its name from "MacGilligans country", which formed a major part of the barony of Keenaght.

Magilligan served as the base line for triangulation for the mapping of Ireland in the 19th century. Colonel Thomas Colby chose Magilligan due to the flatness of the strand and its proximity to Scotland which, along with the rest of Britain, had been accurately mapped in previous decades. A straight line precisely  was measured from North Station to Ballykelly in 1828 from which all other references were measured. The survey finished in 1846 when County Kerry was mapped.

Landmarks

Martello Tower, to the north of Magilligan Point near the lough, commenced construction in 1812, rather late in the British sequence, as the original plan for a fort at Magilligan point was impractical due to soft ground. A genuinely round tower mounting two 24-pounder guns, it has been restored but is normally locked. It was built at the same time as the more unusual double-gunned tower across the lough at Greencastle. 

It was not completed until 1817, two years after Napoleon, against whose invasion it was built to protect, had been exiled to St. Helena. The garrison stationed here never fired a shot at any enemy. During World War II the top of the tower was fitted out with a pillbox. Since the tower was built, deposits of sand have extended the peninsula by several hundred metres and the tower is now located a considerable distance from the sea.

HM Prison Magilligan is situated along the main road (Point Road) to the east of the Magilligan Point. It opened in 1972 and has a capacity of 568 prisoners.

Transport

It is close to Bellarena railway station and there is a ferry service which operates all the year around connecting Magilligan with Greencastle across the lough.

During the 19th century the Londonderry & Coleraine Railway Company (L&CR) operated a short lived tramway between the village of Magilligan and the settlement of Magilligan Point. Opening in July 1885 and closing in October 1885, it is the shortest lived passenger railway line in Ireland.

Notable people
 Donnchadh Ó Hámsaigh (1695 – 1807) – Irish harpist
 John Graham – Church of Ireland clergyman, a senior officer of the Orange Order, and a prolific author of poetic and historical works
 Eddie Butcher (1900 – 1980) – singer, songwriter and song collector

References

External links
Magilligan Martello Tower
 The Lough Foyle Ferry Company
History of Magilligan 1600-1800

Geography of County Londonderry
Special Areas of Conservation in Northern Ireland
Tourism in County Londonderry
Tourist attractions in County Londonderry
Beaches of Northern Ireland
Causeway Coast and Glens district